Pegasus (Chinese: 飞驰人生) is a 2019 Chinese comedy film directed and written by Han Han, starring Shen Teng and Huang Jingyu. The film was released in China and other territories on February 5, 2019, marking Lunar New Year.

Plot
Zhang Chi (Shen Teng) has dreamed of becoming a rally driver since he was a child. In his racing career, he has won  the  Bayinbrook Rally 5 times which represents the highest level in the country. He was only 32 years old when he won the highest honour in Chinese racing and was in his prime. But the birth of his son Zhang Fei and his suspension for participating in illegal drag racing forced Zhang Chi to leave the circuit. But in his heart, he never gave up his racing dream and wanted to prove the glory he once had in front of his son. During the five-year suspension, he abides by the law, relies on fried rice, sets up a book stand to support his family, and never touches a car again. Now he just wants to get back to the circuit, nothing else. The race license will automatically take effect once the driver's license is obtained. Zhang Chi found Sun Yuqiang (Yin Zheng), the navigator of the year. Since Zhang Chi was suspended, Sun Yuqiang also left the team and worked odd jobs for a living. With Zhang Chi's call, he resolutely quit his job and returned to racing for Zhang Chi.

Lin Zhendong (Huang Jingyu) is the most famous rally driver today. He received racing training in England at the age of thirteen and watched Zhang Chi race at eighteen. At 20, Lin Zhendong returned to China and wanted to compete with Zhang Chi on the track, but Zhang Chi was suspended for the incident. In the past five years, Lin Zhendong stood out and became the new king of Bayinbulak Circuit. Next year, he will leave the Chinese arena. So he wants to get the answer he has been waiting for five years at this year's Bayinbulak Rally and battle with Zhang Chi to see who is the real king of Bayinbulak. He Wins the Rally But he Crashes and dies after crossing the finish line.

Production 
This film is based on director Han Han's personal story and is based on the real story of Xu Lang (The enlightenment teacher of Han Han Racing). The character of Lin Zhengdong is based on Han Han's friend Zhang Zhengdong and the character of Sun Yuqiang is based on Han Han's true pilot call Sun Qiang. The word "dedication" (奉献) sees frequent use in Pegasus because Han Han wanted to use this film to tell the story of how he dedicated his life to racing.

"Everyone can dream, but there are only a handful of people chasing dreams. Even fewer people persist to the end. The happiest thing for a person is to dedicate his life to the things he loves."

Music

Soundtrack 

 "Half a Life" (一半人生) by Ashin.
 "How are you brother" (大哥你好吗) by Shen Teng&Tengger
 "Fei Chi De Ren Sheng" (飞驰的人生) by laolang
 "Dedication" (奉献) by Han Han

Cast 

 Shen Teng as Zhang Chi
 Huang Jingyu as Lin Zhengdong
 Yin Zheng as Sun Yuqiang
 Zhang Benyu as Ji Xing
 Yin Fang as Hong Kuo
 Yu Tian as Driving school instructor 
 Zhao Wenxuan(Winston Chao) as Wan Heping
 Tengger (singer) as Big Brother
 Feng Shaofeng as Japanese drift master
 Sui He as Sun Yuqiang's wife
 Li Qingyu as Zhang Fei

Marketing 
In early August 2018, Han Han made a public announcement of Pegasus (飞驰人生) on Weibo, the early promotion of the film involved him uploading behind the scenes footage of himself and some of the main cast. The movie released a thirty-second teaser trailer on October 4, 2018.

Reception

Box office 
Within the first two days of its release Pegasus generated 500 million RMB in box office revenue, and in the following week its revenue reached over a billion RMB.

Accolades 
Pegasus was nominated at the 2019 Golden Rooster Awards for Best Sound and Best Editor.

References

External links

2019 films
Chinese auto racing films
Chinese comedy films
Films set in Xinjiang
Films set in Shanghai
Films shot in Xinjiang
Films shot in Shanghai
Chinese New Year films